{{DISPLAYTITLE:Cavg}}
Cavg is the average concentration of a drug in the central circulation during a dosing interval in steady state. It is calculated by

where  is the area under the curve and  the dosing interval.

See also
 Area under the curve (pharmacokinetics)
 Cmax (pharmacology)

References

Pharmacokinetic metrics